Peter Schaffer may refer to:

 Peter Shaffer (1926–2016), English playwright and screenwriter
 Peter Schaffer (sports agent) (born 1962), American sports agent

See also 
 Peter Schäfer, German historian of religion
 Peter Schaefer (disambiguation)